Sonny and his Wild Cows are a Hungarian rock band from Budapest. Founded in 2002, the band performs 1950s-styled rockabilly, rhythm and blues and rock and roll music.

About Sonny 
Sonny a.k.a. "Mr. Rhythm-and-Blues" (born 1983, Sopron, Hungary) is a singer and guitar player, one of the few rhythm and blues acts in Europe today who perform in the original 1940s–1950s style.

He debuted on stage in 1998, started alone first, with acoustic kind of country blues, then he played with various groups over the years (Blue S. Trio, Big Fat Chubby, Mystery Gang, Gál Csaba Boogie, Little G. Weevil, Raw Hide, Spo-Dee-O-Dee, Palermo Boogie Gang, Mark Tortorici, Rhythm Sophie, Tom Stormy Trio, Ed Phillips and the Memphis Patrol).

The story of the band 

In 2000, he teamed up with Charming Marty harmonica player, and with him and Wins Huber guitarist and Buddy Benkey bass player he founded his own band Sonny and his Wild Cows in 2002. This band played (and is still playing)  almost all kinds of American music of the 1940s and 1950s, blues, rhythm and blues, rock and roll, rock-a-billy, swing, country and western.

The members of the band changed over the years (in 2012 they are Sonny - vocal/guitar, Crazy Benny - piano, Gordon Taylor - bass, Little Tommy - drums, plus lot of times they have one or two saxophones or a harmonica player added).

In 2008, they released their first CD "Mr. Rhythm-and-Blues", in 2011 they made a five songs CD, and in June 2012 they're studio bound again in Berlin, Germany. They appeared many times on the national television of Hungary, and they're still playing many gigs in Hungary, but  they're touring  around Europe, played in 15 countries successfully, great festivals and nice clubs, including the Rhythm Riot in England (as the first Eastern European band in the festival's 15 years history), Motorcycle Gang Jamboree and Red Moon Fest in Italy, South Island Rumble in Denmark, Tear It Up!! festival in Croatia, Sziget festival in Hungary, Polish Boogie festival in Poland, D'Hiver Rock festival and Festival des Arts de Rue in Belgium, Head Banging festival in Germany, Sighisora Blues festival in Romania, In Wires festival in Serbia, and many other international festivals, and also great clubs in London, Amsterdam, Bruxelles, Roma, Berlin, Praha, Wien, Zagreb, etc. In 2012 they'll play in France and Spain for the first time.

References

External links and sources 
 The official Sonny website

Rhythm and blues musical groups
Blues musical groups
Rockabilly music groups
Hungarian rock music groups